Octasulfur is an inorganic substance with the chemical formula . It is an odourless and tasteless yellow solid, and is a major industrial chemical. It is the most common allotrope of sulfur and occurs widely in nature.

Nomenclature 
The name octasulfur is the most commonly used for this chemical. It is systematically named cyclo-octasulfur (which is the preferred IUPAC name) and cyclooctasulfane. It is also the final member of the thiocane heterocylic series, where every carbon atom is substituted with a sulfur atom, thus this sulfur allotrope is systematically named octathiocane as well.

Structure 

The chemical consists of rings of 8 sulfur atoms. It adopts a crown conformation with D4d point group symmetry. The S–S bond lengths are equal, at about 2.05 Å. Octasulfur crystallizes in three distinct polymorphs: rhombohedral, and two monoclinic forms, of which only two are stable at standard conditions. The rhombohedral crystal form is the accepted standard state. The remaining polymorph is only stable between 96 and 115 °C at 100 kPa. Octasulfur forms several allotropes: α-sulfur, β-sulfur, γ-sulfur, and λ-sulfur.

λ-Sulfur is the liquid form of octasulfur, from which γ-sulfur can be crystallised by quenching. If λ-sulfur is crystallised slowly, it will revert to β-sulfur. Since it must have been heated over 115 °C, neither crystallised β-sulfur or γ-sulfur will be pure. The only known method of obtaining pure γ-sulfur is by crystallising from solution.

Octasulfur easily forms large crystals, which are typically yellow and are somewhat translucent.

Production and reactions

It is the main (99%) component of elemental sulfur, which is recovered from volcanic sources and is a major product of the Claus process, associated with petroleum refineries.

See also 
 Sulfur (pharmacy)

References

External links

Agricultural chemicals
Biology and pharmacology of chemical elements
Dietary minerals
Native element minerals
Eight-membered rings
Allotropes of sulfur